The Lawnmower Man is a 1992 science fiction horror film directed by Brett Leonard, written by Leonard and Gimel Everett, and starring Jeff Fahey as Jobe Smith, an intellectually disabled gardener, and Pierce Brosnan as Dr. Lawrence "Larry" Angelo, a scientist who decides to experiment on him in an effort to give him greater intelligence. The experiments give Jobe superhuman abilities, but also increase his aggression, turning him into a man obsessed with evolving into a digital being.

The film is adapted from the merging of a 1975 short story by Stephen King with an original screenplay entitled "CyberGod." While King's story focused on the titular character, a rotund, animal-like Pan worshipper who strips naked and eats the newly cut grass like a goat while controlling his lawnmower with mystical powers, the film has the same character controlling the lawnmower by means of the untapped potential of the human brain, which has been stimulated by advanced, but unethical scientific experiementation. In both versions, the character, initially presented as an unthreatening worker, turns into a menace once his powers are manifested, but in the film, this is the result of stimulation of the brain by nootropic drugs beyond the titular character's capacity for human goodness. 

Because of the deviation from his story, King successfully sued to have his name removed from the film, which was originally titled Stephen King's The Lawnmower Man. He won further damages when his name was included in the title of the home video release.

A sequel, Lawnmower Man 2: Beyond Cyberspace, was released in 1996, with Austin O'Brien as the only returning actor from the original film.

Plot
Dr. Lawrence Angelo works for Virtual Space Industries and runs experiments using psychoactive drugs and virtual reality to enhance cognitive performance, using chimpanzees as test subjects, in an experiment labeled "Project 5". Angelo has benevolent aims, but VSI is funded by "The Shop", a clandestine group hoping to find military applications for Angelo's research. One of the chimpanzees, "Rosco," gifted with new intelligence, warfare training, and increased aggression, escapes, and after being hunted, is killed by the laboratory's security forces. Angelo consequently decides to recruit intellectually disabled gardener Jobe Smith as a test subject, telling the man he will become smarter. Angelo redesigns the intelligence-boosting treatments to remove the "aggression factors" used in the chimpanzee experiments. Not only is Jobe's intelligence enhanced, but he also develops psychokinesis and telepathy. He continues training at the lab until an accident forces Angelo to abort the experiment.

The project director, Sebastian Timms, keeps tabs on the progress of the experiment and secretly swaps Angelo's new medications with the old Project 5 supply. When Jobe invites his new lover Marnie to the lab to engage in cybersex, he accidentally lobotomizes her. Jobe continues the treatment on his own and begins killing the people who mistreated him in the past, as well as the abusive father of his 10-year-old friend Peter. Angelo learns the drugs have been swapped and confronts Jobe, who captures him and declares his plan to reach an ultimate stage of evolution by becoming a being of "pure energy" existing in the VSI computer mainframe, connecting to all computer systems of the world afterward. He promises his "birth" will be signaled by every telephone on the planet ringing simultaneously.

The Shop sends a team to capture Jobe, but with his new abilities he scatters them to pieces. Jobe uses the lab equipment to enter the VSI mainframe and become a digital being, abandoning his physical body. Angelo remotely accesses the VSI computer, encrypting connections to the outside world, and traps Jobe in the mainframe. As Jobe searches for an unencrypted network connection, Angelo sets bombs to destroy the building. Feeling responsible for what happened to Jobe, Angelo enters virtual reality to attempt to reason with him one last time or die with him. Jobe overpowers Angelo and crucifies his digital body. Peter runs into the building and Jobe realizes he is in danger from the bombs. Still caring for the boy, he allows Angelo to leave the mainframe in order to rescue Peter. Jobe escapes through a maintenance line just before the building is destroyed.

Angelo is later at home with Peter and his mother Carla. The telephone rings, followed by the noise of a second telephone ringing elsewhere, followed by all telephones ringing all around the world.

Cast
 Pierce Brosnan as Dr. Lawrence Angelo
 Jeff Fahey as Jobe Smith
 Jenny Wright as Marnie Burke
 Geoffrey Lewis as Terry McKeen
 Jeremy Slate as Father Francis McKeen
 Dean Norris as The Director
 Austin O'Brien as Peter Parkette
 Troy Evans as Lieutenant Goodwin
 Rosalee Mayeux as Carla Parkette
 Mark Bringelson as Sebastian Timms
 Ray Lykins as Harold Parkette
 Colleen Coffey as Caroline Angelo

Production
The plot of Stephen King's 1975 short story "The Lawnmower Man" concerns Harold Parkette, who hires "Pastoral Greenery and Outdoor Services Inc." to cut his lawn. Parkette later spies on the serviceman, discovering his lawnmower mows the lawn by itself while he crawls after it, naked, eating the grass. The serviceman is actually a satyr who worships the Greek god Pan. When Parkette tries to call the police, the mower and its owner ritually kill him as a sacrifice to Pan.

The film's original script, written by director Brett Leonard and producer Gimel Everett, was written between May and August 1990 under the title The Lawnmower Man, and carried minor elements of King's original story, including the scene where Jobe kills Peter's father with the lawnmower "Big Red", and the aftermath in which the police state that they found some of his remains in the birdbath. The addition of a government agency known as "The Shop" was drawn from separate works of King's, such as Firestarter (1980) and The Tommyknockers (1987). Leonard stated that the main inspiration for placing the story in virtual reality was seeing Jaron Lanier and his VPL Research technology at a San Francisco event called "Cyberthon"; Brosnan later suggested using some Lanier's lines in the film, and both VPL's DataSuit and EyePhone appear in the film as props.

The film has several elements in common with the 1959 Daniel Keyes novel Flowers for Algernon, which also deals with a mentally disabled man whose intelligence is technologically boosted to genius levels. A similar parallel can be drawn with the Star Trek television series (second pilot) episode of 1966 titled "Where No Man Has Gone Before".

The computer-generated imagery (CGI) was created for the film by Angel Studios. The supervising sound editor was Frank Serafine, who was hired as a result of his sound creation work in the 1982 film Tron. Fuji Creative's Masao Takiyama is also credited as a co-producer.

Release

The film was tested in Jacksonville, Florida, Fresno, California and Providence, Rhode Island on February 14, 1992 and released in the United States on March 6, in 1,276 theatres.

The film was released in Japan under the title Virtual Wars.

2017 Director's Cut
The original theatrical release had a large element cut from it involving a chimpanzee. In the film's opening this chimpanzee escapes the lab and is helped by Jobe who then witnesses it shot dead. This then led to several other cuts throughout the film to remove call back to this plot element. In the Director's Cut these elements are noticeable as they have been taken from the film's original negative.

Critical reception
, the film held a 37% rating on Rotten Tomatoes based on 41 reviews. The site's consensus states: "The Lawnmower Man suffers from a predictable, melodramatic script, and its once-groundbreaking visual effects look dated today". Metacritic gives the film a rating of 42 out of 100 based on 14 reviews.

Box office
The movie debuted at number two at the box office with $7.7 million in its opening weekend behind Wayne's World. It went on to gross $32.1 million in the United States and Canada, making it a moderate financial success against its $10 million budget and the biggest independent film for the calendar year and the second biggest released in 1992 after Miramax's The Crying Game. It grossed £3,622,720 ($6 million) in the United Kingdom.

Stephen King lawsuit
The film, originally titled Stephen King's The Lawnmower Man, differed so much from the source material that King sued the filmmakers in May 1992 to remove his name from the title. King stated in court documents that the film "bore no meaningful resemblance" to his story.

A federal judge ruled in King's favour in July 1992, the first successful such ruling since James Oliver Curwood had his name removed from 1922's I Am the Law. On appeal, it was ruled in October that the on-screen credit could remain but that King's name should be removed from advertising. King received $2.5 million in settlement.

Despite the ruling, New Line still did not comply and initially released the home video version as Stephen King's The Lawnmower Man. In 1994, New Line was held in contempt of court.

Home media
The theatrical version of the film was initially released on VHS and Laserdisc on August 26, 1992. Alongside the 108-minute theatrical version, New Line Home Video also released an unrated director's cut running 142 minutes on VHS and Laserdisc. The success of the unrated version alerted King to New Line's continued defiance of the order that his name be stricken from the film's credits and all marketing as the back covers stated "Based on a Story by Stephen King". A third court order was needed to force the studio's compliance. As before, the court upheld the two prior judgments, but it took the extra step of imposing a penalty of $10,000 directly payable to King for every day New Line remained in contempt by defying the order. Additionally, the studio would have to forfeit all profits earned on the film during that same period.

The film was released on VCD in 1996. The DVD, released in December 1997, contains only the theatrical cut, with scenes from the unrated edition being presented on the DVD as deleted scenes.

In February 1997, the director's cut was released in widescreen for the first time on double LaserDisc, featuring various special features on the C-side. The transfer used for the LaserDisc left King's name in the opening credits, but removed it from the title screen.

The director's cut was released on DVD with the inclusion of the sequel Lawnmower Man 2 on October 25, 2010, in the United Kingdom, but this release suffered from poor NTSC quality transfer with the aspect ratio of 4:3 pan and scan, the extended scenes spliced-in but in the aspect ratio of 16:9.

Prior to the US Shout! Factory release, Blu-ray versions of the film were only available in Italy through Minerva Pictures and in Germany under the Alive brand. The Italian release contains edited Italian credits at the beginning, which are taken from the DVD version as the difference in quality from the rest of the movie can be seen (interlaced framing notably).

Shout! Factory released The Lawnmower Man on Blu-ray for the first time in the United States in June 2017. The two-disc set includes new 4k digital restorations of the theatrical and director's cuts, audio commentary with director Brett Leonard and producer Gimel Everett, an all-new retrospective documentary featuring Leonard and star Jeff Fahey, and all of the bonus features from the original New Line DVD. For unknown reasons, a line of dialogue from the theatrical release related to the killing of a chimp (which makes no sense in the context of the plot of the director's cut - in that version, the chimp escaped from the VSI lab) was re-introduced to the director's cut.

In Australia, the only version of the film to be released was the theatrical cut - the director's cut was only available as a UK import. It was never released on DVD until 2008, when Force Entertainment released a budget DVD, containing the theatrical cut and the special features from the US DVD, on its own or as a two-pack with its sequel.

Sequel and other media
A graphic novel adaptation of the film was announced by Innovation Comics for April 1992 release, but was never published.

A sequel, Lawnmower Man 2: Beyond Cyberspace, was released in 1996 with Austin O'Brien as the only returning actor from the original film. It was retitled Lawnmower Man 2: Jobe's War for its video release. The film received negative reviews from critics and fans of the first movie.

The film spawned two video games: The Lawnmower Man in 1993, and Cyberwar in 1994.

Comic book writer Grant Morrison said in an interview that they were contacted by the owners of the Lawnmower Man in 1995 and asked to write treatments for Lawnmower Man 2. Morrison claims they were asked to "bend the Lawnmower Man series in an X-Men superhero-type direction". Neither of Morrison's script treatments was used and Lawnmower Man 2: Beyond Cyberspace was produced without their involvement.

Some of the CGI footage of The Lawnmower Man was featured in the 1992 CG art film Beyond the Mind's Eye.

Jaunt VR, a virtual reality studio, attempted to adapt the feature into a virtual reality experience with the original rights holders but ultimately went out of business before realizing its efforts.

Short film
An earlier short film, also titled The Lawnmower Man, was directed by Jim Gonis in 1987. That film was a direct adaptation of the short story by King.

See also

 Transcendence
 Lucy
 Ghost in the Shell

References

External links
 
 
 
 
 

1992 films
1992 horror films
1990s science fiction horror films
1992 independent films
American independent films
American science fiction horror films
American films about revenge
Films about computing
1990s English-language films
Films about consciousness transfer
Films about telepresence
Films about technological impact
Films about intellectual disability
Films directed by Brett Leonard
Films set in California
Films about virtual reality
Techno-thriller films
Cyberpunk films
Techno-horror films
Films shot from the first-person perspective
Films based on works by Stephen King
1990s American films